Felipe de Cáceres was a Spanish conquistador and Governor of Rio de la Plata.

Despite the preference of the people of Asunción for Juan Ortiz de Zárate to replace Francisco Ortiz de Vergara as governor of Rio de la Plata, the Royal Audience at Charcas appointed the accountant Felipe de Cáceres to the post. 

He had previously assisted Domingo Martínez de Irala in removing Alvar Núñez Cabeza de Vaca from power, and during his administration quarrelled with Fray Pedro de la Torre, the first bishop of Paraguay. Returning from a trip to the mouth of the Paraná, he was accosted upon his return to Asunción and arrested under the authority of the bishop. The viceroy Martin Suarez de Toledo approved the incarceration and ordered de Cáceres removed to Spain.

Although he broke jail en route with the help of the Portuguese, the captain Ruy Diaz Melgarejo was able to recapture him.

Spanish conquistadors
16th-century Spanish people
16th-century explorers
16th-century births
16th-century deaths

Governors of the Río de la Plata